Copyright in Bermuda applies automatically and it is not necessary to register a work to benefit from copyright protection.

References

External links 
https://www.conyersdill.com/publication-files/2016_12_BDA_Intellectual_Property_and_Trade_Mark_Protection.pdf

Bermuda
Bermudian law